The 2015 Tour of Sibiu took place between 1 July and 5 July. For the first time it was raced over 5 days, and moved forward in the calendar by nearly three weeks. Adria Mobil later withdrew to be replaced by Southeast Pro Cycling taking the number of pro-continental teams in the race to four. The race was wn by Mauro Finetto who won the mountain stage to Paltanis and was able to retain his jersey through to the finale.

Teams

Route and Stages

References

External links
 

Sibiu Cycling Tour
2015 in Romanian sport
Cycle races in Romania